Atomic tourism or nuclear tourism is a recent form of tourism in which visitors learn about the Atomic Age by traveling to significant sites in atomic history such as museums with atomic weapons, missile silos, vehicles that carried atomic weapons or sites where atomic weapons were detonated.

In the United States, the Center for Land Use Interpretation has conducted tours of the Nevada Test Site, Trinity Site, Hanford Site, and other historical atomic age sites, to explore the cultural significance of these Cold War nuclear zones. The book Overlook: Exploring the Internal Fringes of America describes the purpose of this tourism as  "windows into the American psyche, landmarks that manifest the rich ambiguities of the nation's cultural history." A Bureau of Atomic Tourism was proposed by American photographer Richard Misrach and writer Myriam Weisang Misrach in 1990.

The phenomenon is not exclusive to North America.  Visitors to the Chernobyl Exclusion Zone often visit the nearby deserted city of Pripyat. The Hiroshima Peace Memorial (Genbaku Dome), which survived the destruction of Hiroshima, is now a UNESCO World Heritage Site at the center of Hiroshima Peace Memorial Park.  Bikini Atoll was at one time the site of a diving tourism initiative. As of 2012, China planned to build a tourist destination at its first atomic test site, the Malan Base at Lop Nur in the Xinjiang Uyghur Autonomous Region.

During the early atomic age when fission was viewed as a sign of progress and modernity, the city of Las Vegas and its Chamber of Commerce nicknamed Vegas as the "Atomic City" in the mid-1940s and early 1950s in an attempt to attract tourists. So called "bomb viewing parties" took place on desert hilltops, or more famously at the panoramic Sky Room at the Desert Inn, and casinos held Miss Atomic pageants while serving Atomic Cocktails.

Atomic museums

Research and production
 Los Alamos Historical Museum, Los Alamos, New Mexico - items from the Manhattan Project
 Bradbury Science Museum, Los Alamos, New Mexico - history of the Manhattan Project
 X-10 Graphite Reactor, Oak Ridge, Tennessee - first nuclear reactor to produce Plutonium 239
 Savannah River Site, South Carolina - production site of plutonium and tritium
 Experimental Breeder Reactor I, Arco, Idaho - first nuclear reactor to produce electrical power, first breeder reactor, and first reactor to use plutonium as fuel
 Obninsk Nuclear Power Plant, Obninsk - the first nuclear reactor in the world that produced commercial electricity
 Hanford Site, Washington - location of the B Reactor which produced some of the plutonium for the Trinity test and the Fat Man bomb
 George Herbert Jones Laboratory, Chicago, Illinois - where plutonium was first isolated and characterized
 American Museum of Science and Energy, Oak Ridge, Tennessee - bomb casings
 National Atomic Testing Museum, Las Vegas, Nevada - Nevada Test Site
 Strategic missile forces museum in Ukraine, Ukraine
 National Museum of Nuclear Science & History, Albuquerque, New Mexico

Delivery vehicles
 Tinian Airfield, Northern Mariana Islands - launch site for the atomic bombings of Hiroshima and Nagasaki, Japan during World War II
 Titan Missile Museum, Sahuarita, Arizona - public underground missile museum
 Nike Missile Site SF-88, Marin County, California - fully restored Nike missile complex
 Ronald Reagan Minuteman Missile State Historic Site, Cooperstown, North Dakota - last surviving complete facilities from USAF 321st Missile Wing (01Nov63-30Sep98), namely Oscar-Zero Missile Alert Facility (4 mi N of Cooperstown) and November-33 Launch Facility (missile silo, 2 mi E of Cooperstown)
 National Museum of Nuclear Science & History, Albuquerque, New Mexico - missiles and rockets
 National Museum of the United States Air Force, Dayton, Ohio - the Nagasaki B-29 bomber (Bockscar) and missiles
 National Air and Space Museum, Washington, D.C. - the Hiroshima B-29 bomber (Enola Gay)
 White Sands Missile Range, New Mexico
 Air Force Space and Missile Museum, Cape Canaveral Space Force Station, Florida
 Air Force Armament Museum, Eglin Air Force Base, Florida
 Minuteman Missile National Historic Site, Wall, South Dakota - Launch Control Facility Delta-01 with its corresponding underground Launch Control Center and Launch Facility (Missile Silo) Delta-09
 South Dakota Air and Space Museum, Ellsworth Air Force Base, Box Elder, South Dakota - Minuteman Missile Transporter truck,  44th Missile Wing Training Launch Facility (Training Missile Silo)
 Strategic Air Command & Aerospace Museum, Ashland, Nebraska -  a museum focusing on aircraft and nuclear missiles of the United States Air Force
 Quebec-One Missile Alert Facility, Laramie County, Wyoming - preserved Peacekeeper missile launch control facility

Miscellaneous

 Greenbrier Bunker, Greenbrier County, West Virginia - underground bunker for the United States Congress
 Hiroshima Peace Memorial Park, Hiroshima - contains the Hiroshima Peace Memorial, Hiroshima Peace Memorial Museum, and related memorials
 Nagasaki Peace Park and Nagasaki Atomic Bomb Museum, Nagasaki
 The Daigo Fukuryū Maru ship, a Japanese fishing boat that was contaminated after the Castle Bravo detonation in 1954,  it is now on display in Tokyo at the Tokyo Metropolitan Daigo Fukuryū Maru Exhibition Hall.
 CFS Carp - also known as The Diefenbunker, a cold war nuclear museum in a former underground Canadian military facility outside of Ottawa
 Chernobyl Museum, Kiev
 Hack Green Secret Nuclear Bunker, Cheshire countryside near the town on Nantwich, UK
 Kelvedon Hatch Secret Nuclear Bunker
 Waste Isolation Pilot Plant Field Office exhibit hall

Atomic mines
 Port Radium on Canada's Great Bear Lake site of a uranium mine important to the Manhattan Project

Explosion sites

The alphabetic list by nations is as follows:
 Australia
 Maralinga, South Australia - site of Operation Buffalo and Operation Antler

 India
 Pokhran, Rajasthan - site of the Pokhran-II test
 Japan
 Hiroshima, first wartime use of an atomic bomb
 Nagasaki, last wartime use of an atomic bomb
 United States
 Carson National Forest, Rio Arriba County, New Mexico - site of Project Gasbuggy
 Carlsbad, New Mexico - site of Project Gnome
 Nevada Test Site, Nye County, Nevada - US nuclear test site
 Nye County, Nevada - site of Project Faultless
 Pacific Proving Grounds, US nuclear test site
 Parachute, Colorado - site of Project Rulison
 Rio Blanco County, Colorado - site of Project Rio Blanco
 Sand Springs Range, Nevada - site of Project Shoal
 Trinity Site, Socorro County, New Mexico - site of the first artificial nuclear explosion
 Soviet Union
 Semipalatinsk Test Site, testing venue for the Soviet Union's nuclear weapons.

Atomic accidents
 The Chernobyl disaster was the worst nuclear power plant accident in history. Tourists can access the exclusion zone surrounding the plant, and in particular the abandoned city of Prypiat.<ref>[https://www.nytimes.com/2005/06/15/international/europe/15chernobyl.html'New Sight in Chernobyl's Dead Zone: Tourists - New York Times]</ref>
 Three Mile Island was the site of a well publicized accident, the most significant in the history of American commercial nuclear power. The Three Mile Island Visitor Center, in Middletown, PA, educates the public through exhibitions and video displays.
 Windscale fire On October 10, 1957, the graphite core of a British nuclear reactor at Windscale, Cumbria, caught fire, releasing substantial amounts of radioactive contamination into the surrounding area. The event, known as the Windscale fire, was considered the world's worst reactor accident until the Three Mile Island accident in 1979. Both incidents were dwarfed by the magnitude of the Chernobyl disaster in 1986. The Visitor Center was closed in 1992, and the public may no longer visit, it has been turned into a center for supplier conferences, and business events.

Literary and cinematic works on atomic tourism
The novel O-Zone'', by Paul Theroux, involves a group of wealthy New York tourists who enter and party in a post-nuclear disaster zone in the Ozarks.

References

External links 

 Atomic Heritage Foundation
 My Radioactive Vacation by Phil Stuart
 Hanford site tours
 "Adventures in Atomic Tourism"
 Atomkeller Museum Haigerloch, Germany
 Atomic Tourism: Exploring the world's Nuclear at Atomic Sites

 
Nuclear war and weapons in popular culture
Types of tourism